Holding may refer to:
 Holding an object with the hands, or grasping
 Holding (law), the central determination in a judicial opinion
 Holding (aeronautics), a manoeuvre in aviation
 Holding (surname)
 Holding company, a company that owns stock in other companies
 Holding (American football), a common penalty in American football
 The Miroslav Holding Co., 2001 Croatian film also released as Holding
 "Holding", an episode of the American animated television series Beavis and Butt-Head
 Holding (TV series), a 2022 TV series

See also
 
 
 Smallholding
 Hold (disambiguation)
 The Holding (disambiguation)
 "Holdin'," a song by Diamond Rio
 Hoarding
 Possession (law)